Egg of Life is a 2003 Nigerian film all about healing a prince on the verge of death. It was directed by Andy Amenechi and written by Kabat Esosa Egbon & Ojiofor Ezeanyaeche.

Cast 
Padita Agu as Nkem
Sam Ajah as Madu
Funke Akindele as Isioma
Ozo Akubueze as Ichie Arinze
Gazza Anderson as Segbeilo
Nina Bob-Chudey as Obiageli
Clarion Chukwura as Priestess
Pete Edochie as Igwe
Fidelis Ezenwa as Ogbuefi Nwabuzor
Ifeanyi Ezeokeke as Ikemefuria Snr
Nnadi Ihuoma as Chioma
Sabinus Mole as Amaka
Dike Ngwube as Ogogo
Somtoo Obasi as Newborn baby
Ebele Okaro-Onyiuke as Lolo
Stanley Okereke as Okonkwo
Georgina Onuoha as Buchi

Synopsis 
The prince on the verge of death  needs to be saved by the magical egg of life, this require group of girls to go to the forest in order to save his life according the Priestess.

See also 
Funke Akindele

Amaechi Muonagor

Who's the boss (2020 film)

References

External links

2003 films
Nigerian fantasy films
English-language Nigerian films